The Ofnet Caves are the remains of an underground karst system on the edge of the Nördlinger Ries in Germany. They are located on a limestone hill near Nördlingen, Bavaria. The caves became famous in 1908 when 33 prehistoric human skulls were discovered. The skulls were dated to the Mesolithic period.

Description
There are two caves (or rock shelters) called the Grosse and Kleine Ofnet (Large and Small Ofnet). In the Grosse Ofnet in 1908 archaeologist R. R. Schmidt found two dish-shaped pits in which human skulls were lying "like eggs in flat baskets". In the larger pit were 27 skulls and in the other there were 6 skulls. The skulls were arranged concentrically with their faces turned towards the setting sun. They were all covered with a thick layer of red ochre. The skulls have been dated to the 7th millennium BC.

References

External links

Landforms of Bavaria
Caves of Germany
Archaeological sites in Germany
Nördlingen